Nandnama is one of the largest villages in the Lakhisarai district in the Indian state of Bihar. It is 14 km south of the administrative district headquarters in Lakhisarai and 134 km from the state capital, Patna. It currently has a population of 15,000 and is connected to nearby areas by road and railway. It includes several schools, colleges and other educational institutions.

Economy 

Agriculture is the main occupation, with a majority of the population engaged in cultivating crops such as rice, wheat, onions and mangoes.

Festivals 

People living in Nand Nama celebrate various religious and social events. Some of them are among the non-religious festivals that celebrate regional culture. Many local festivals celebrate the locals' lifestyle, such as those related to the change of seasons and the harvest. The most prominent fairs and festivals include the Chhath Fasting, Durga Puja, Makar Sankranti, Nag Panchami, Holi, Eid and Muharram.

Transport 

 Kiul Junction
 Lakhisarai Junction
 National Highway 80
 Lok Nayak Jayaprakash Airport, Patna, around 125 km

References 

Cities and towns in Lakhisarai district